Alma Rayford (March 24, 1903 – February 14, 1987) was an American film actress of the silent era.

Rayford specialized in western films, appearing in 18 features and a number of two-reel films.

Selected filmography
 The Passing of Wolf MacLean (1924)
 Romance of the Wasteland (1924)
 The Terror of Pueblo (1924)
 The Demon Rider (1925)
 Ace of Action (1926)
 Deuce High (1926)
 Vanishing Hoofs (1926)
 The Haunted Range (1926) aka The Haunted Ranch
 The Phantom Buster (1927)
 Between Dangers (1927)
 The Valley of Hunted Men (1928)
Young Whirlwind (1928)

References

External links

1903 births
1987 deaths
American film actresses
People from Muskogee, Oklahoma
20th-century American actresses
Western (genre) film actresses